Parnasala  is a village in the Dummugudem mandal in the newly formed Bhadradri Kothagudem district (formerly in Khammam district) of Telangana, India. The village is accessible by road and boats and is situated 32 km from the temple town of Bhadrachalam.

Bhadrachalam area has several Hindu deities connected with Epic book Ramayana.

Geography

Demographics
According to the 2001 Indian census, the demographic details of Parnasala village are as follows:
 Total population: 	513 in 116 households
 Male population: 	253
 Female population: 	260
 Children under 6 years of age: 51 (boys - 23 and girls - 28)
 Total literates: 	429

Legend

According to legend, it is said the "Lord Sri Rama "spent some of the 14 years of exile at this location. The locals believe that Sita, the beloved consort of "Lord Sri Rama" bathed in the stream here and dried her clothes on "Radhagutta" where the imprints are seen even today. The demon king "Ravana" parked his Pushpaka on the hillock on the opposite side of the river and abducted her. An earthen ditch reportedly caused when Ravana removed earth to carry off Sita to Lanka can be seen here.  Another Hindu legend names Parnashala as the location  where Rama killed Maricha, who came in disguise of a golden deer to deceive Sita.

References

Villages in Khammam district